Paulse is a surname. Notable people with the surname include:

 Breyton Paulse (born 1976), South African rugby union player
 Hillroy Paulse (born 1985), South African cricketer
 Nathan Paulse (born 1982), South African soccer player

See also
 Paulsen